This is a list of artists from, or associated with, Cambodia.

C
 Monirith Chhea (born 1960s)
 Chhan Dina (born 1984)

D
 Nhek Dim (1934-1978)
 Duong Saree (born 1957)

N
 Vann Nath (1946-2011)

O
 Chanthou Oeur

P
 Sopheap Pich (born 1971)
 Chath Piersath

R
 Chhoen Rithy (born 1965)

S
 LinDa Saphan (born 1975)
 Duong Saree (born 1957)
 Hen Sophal (born 1958)
 Chhim Sothy (born 1969)

T

Y
 You Khin (1947-2009)

Artists

Lists of artists by nationality